The 1996 CONCACAF Pre-Olympic Tournament was the ninth edition of the CONCACAF Pre-Olympic Tournament, the quadrennial, international, age-restricted football tournament organised by CONCACAF to determine which men's under-23 national teams from the North, Central America and Caribbean region qualify for the Olympic football tournament. It was held in Canada, from 10 and 19 May 1996.

It was the first time in which teams that qualified for the Olympics were permitted to supplement their rosters with three players not restricted by age in its 18-man final list.

Mexico, as winners qualified for the 1996 Summer Olympics together with the United States who automatically qualified as hosts. Second-placed Canada later lost to Australia in the CONCACAF–OFC play-off and failed to qualify for the Olympics for the third consecutive time.

Qualification

Qualified teams
The following teams qualified for the final tournament.

1 Only final tournament.

Venues
The matches were played in Edmonton.

Squads

Final round

Statistics

Goalscorers

Qualified teams for Summer Olympics
The following two teams from CONCACAF qualified for the 1996 Summer Olympics, including the United States which qualified as hosts.

1 Bold indicates champions for that year. Italic indicates hosts for that year.

References

External links
 RSSSF.com – Games of the XXVI. Olympiad | Football Qualifying Tournament

1996
CONCACAF Men's Olympic Qualifying Tournament
Oly
Football qualification for the 1996 Summer Olympics